Alwi Abdurrahman Shihab  (born 19 August 1946 in South Sulawesi) is a scholar of the interaction of Christian and Muslim communities.  Currently he is the Indonesian President's special envoy to the Middle East and the Organisation of Islamic Cooperation. He held the office of Indonesian Coordinating Minister for People's Welfare in 2004–2005 and the Foreign Minister of Indonesia from 1999 to 2001.

Education
At age of 10, Alwi went to study basic education at Darul Nashihin Boarding School in Lawang, East Java. Later, Alwi's father sent him and his brother Quraish to Cairo to continue their high school abroad.  After completing his high school in Cairo, Alwi continued and completed his bachelor's degree from Al-Azhar University and acquired L.C. degree in 1968 in Islamic philosophy. He then continued his education in Indonesia and completed his master at Alaudin State Institute of Islamic Studies (Institut Agama Islam Negeri Alaudin), Ujung Pandang in 1986. His first doctoral degree was acquired in 1990 from University of Ain Shams, Cairo with research dissertation in the area of tasawwuf and Islamic philosophy with thesis title Islamic Sufism and Its Impact on Indonesian Contemporary Sufism.

In 1991, Alwi went to US to continue his education at Temple University, US. He and his family initially stayed in Carbondale, Illinois in 1991, but later moved to a town in Pennsylvania and completed his M.A in 1992.  Not satisfied with a single doctoral degree, he then completed his second PhD from the same university in 1995 with dissertation The Muhammadiyah Movement and Its Controversy with Christian Mission in Indonesia. While at Temple, Alwi become assistant professor for the Department of Religion.

Alwi also did some post-doctorate at The Harvard University's Divinity School during 1995–1996 period.  Later, he joined Hartford Seminary in Hartford as professor of religion.  In 1998 he served as fellow and visiting professor at Harvard University's Divinity School - Center for the Study of World Religions.

In the 1990s he wrote a book about Islam-Christianity interaction: Islam Inklusif He also completed two works for publication: a manuscript entitled American Students’ Perceptions of Islam, and a translated (from Arabic to English) version of a previous publication entitled Islamic Mysticism and Its Impact on Indonesian Society.

In 2002 he became adjunct professor for graduate programs at the University of Indonesia and currently is a member of Universitas Indonesia (UI) Board of Trustees.

Career
In politics, His political career started when he was elected as member of Indonesian parliament and then minister of foreign affairs in The Wahid administration. Alwi was the chairman of PKB (The National Awakening Party). He served as Coordinating Minister for People's Welfare and a minister in Susilo Bambang Yudhoyono's cabinet.

Alwi, unlike his brothers who focus their career in education and Islamic studies only, has also strong business entrepreneurship.  Since after completing his education in Cairo, Alwi started some businesses. In 1975 to 1979 he was CEO of Glass Priangan Factory in Cianjur, Indonesia.  During 1979 -1982 he was the President of Director for Alfa Contracting Company in Jeddah.  In 1982 to 1986 he was the President of Director of PT. Prima Advera company in Jakarta.  In 1982 he founded  Yayasan Darul Qur'an, also in Jakarta. During 1986 -1990 he became a member of board of directors at Eagle Tripelti in Jakarta and since 1986, he has been a member of the board of Dhafco Manunggal Sejati, Jakarta.

On October 26, 2004 he was honorarily discharged from PKB due to the party's internal political conflict and clash with some other leaders.  In 2007 he founded his own party, Partai Kebangkitan Nasional Ulama (PKNU) or "Party of National Scholar Awakening" in which he still serves as the chairman until now.

Since 2006, Alwi has been appointed as the president's special envoy to the Middle East and the Organisation of Islamic Cooperation.

Publications
Alwi has written a number of books, including:
 Akar Tasawuf di Indonesia - Antara Tasawuf Sunni dan Tasawuf Falsafi (The root of Sufism in Indonesia - Between Sunni Sufism and Philosophical Sufism), published by IMaN in 2009.
 Membedah Islam di Barat - Menepis Tudingan Meluruskan Kesalah pahaman (Dissecting Islam in the West - Dismissing Allegations, Straightening the Misunderstandings), published by Gramedia in 2004.
 Islam Sufistik, Mizan 2001.
 Membendung Arus - Respon Gerakan Muhammadiyah Terhadap Penetrasi Misi Kristen di Indonesia (Curbing the current - The Muhammadiyah's Response against Penetration of Christian Mission in Indonesia), Mizan, 1998.
 Islam Inklusif - Menuju Sikap Terbuka dalam Bergama (Inclusive Islam - Towards an Openness in Religion), Mizan, 1997.

Personal life
Alwi Shihab is of Hadhrami Arab descent and claims a lineage as a Sayyid, or a descendant of the Islamic prophet Muhammad (via Zayn al-Abidin, great-grandson of Muhammad).

He has continuously tried to present Islam as an inclusive, moderate religion, basing this on his reading of the Qur'an.

References

External links

Profile at TokohIndonesia.com (In Indonesian)
Biodata (in Indonesia)

1946 births
Hashemite people
Living people
Indonesian Muslims
Indonesian people of Yemeni descent
Hadhrami people
Hartford Seminary faculty
National Awakening Party politicians
Foreign ministers of Indonesia
Politicians from South Sulawesi
People from Sidenreng Rappang Regency
Sunni Sufis
20th-century Muslim scholars of Islam